WPTF (680 AM) is a commercial radio station broadcasting a news/talk radio format. Licensed to Raleigh, the station serves the Research Triangle area of North Carolina. It is owned by the Curtis Media Group, with studios located on Highwoods Boulevard in Raleigh. WPTF's transmitter site is a three-tower facility off East Chatham Street, near Maynard Road NE, in Cary, North Carolina.

Transmitter
WPTF is one of two AM radio stations in North Carolina, along with WBT in Charlotte, which operate fulltime with 50,000 watts, the maximum power for AM stations in the U.S. (As a Class A clear-channel station, WBT has more protection from other stations than WPTF, which is classified as Class B.) 

WPTF has a non-directional daytime signal from a single tower.  It switches to a directional signal at night from two towers to avoid interference to other stations on 680 kHz. Its nighttime signal is primarily required to protect the dominant Class A station on 680 kHz, KNBR in San Francisco, and also must avoid interfering with several stations to the north on 680 kHz, including WCBM in Baltimore, WRKO in Boston and CFTR in Toronto. Even with this restriction, at night WPTF can be heard across much of the Southeastern United States with a good radio.

To improve its nighttime coverage, WPTF programming is carried on four FM translator stations: 98.5 MHz in Cary, 98.7 MHz in Rolesville, 103.3 MHz Durham and 107.5 MHz in Smithfield.

Programming
Weekday programs on WPTF include local news blocks in morning drive time, noon and afternoons.  Three nationally syndicated talk shows are on the weekday line up: Brian Kilmeade, Rich Valdes and Red Eye Radio. WPTF's local coverage is supplemented by the CBS Radio Network, AP Radio, and the co-owned North Carolina News Network.

Weekends feature shows on health, money, gardening and home improvement, some of which are paid brokered programming. Long-time staple "The Weekend Gardener," hosted by Mike Raley and Ann Clapp, is heard for three hours on Saturday mornings.  Saturday and Sunday evenings feature "The All-Star Country Show" playing classic country music.

WPTF is the Raleigh/Durham affiliate of the University of North Carolina Tar Heel Sports Network, sharing flagship status with WCHL in Chapel Hill.  WPTF carries Tar Heels football and men's basketball games, along with the coaches' shows for both sports and the weekly "Primetime In The ACC" show.

History

Founding

WPTF was first licensed on October 25, 1924, as WFBQ with 50 watts on 1190 kHz, to the Wynne Radio Company, owned by William Avera Wynne, at 226 Fayetteville Street in Raleigh. However, earlier that month the company had announced it was broadcasting World's Series reports, and later advertised that "We built and operated said Station long before we received the license" for WFBQ. The original call letters were randomly assigned from a sequential roster of available call signs. WFBQ was the second Raleigh radio station, following the short-lived WLAC which was licensed to the North Carolina State College from August 31, 1922 to October 29, 1923.

William Wynne had long been a local technical leader. In 1899 he established the Raleigh Telephone Company, and prior to World War One built a radio receiver used to pick up nightly time signals broadcast by NAA in Arlington, Virginia, in order to accurately set the timepieces at the Jolly-Wynne Jewelry Store. In 1922, at the age of 55, Wynne sold his telephone company and opened the radio equipment store. As of June 30, 1924, he held a license for amateur station 4RU, located at 323 Hillsboro Street in Raleigh.

In 1922, there was rapidly increasing interest by the general public in the recently introduced innovation of radio broadcasting. However, in 1924 there were no local Raleigh radio stations, so listeners were limited to nighttime reception of distant stations, which required more expensive equipment. The establishment of WFBQ provided Wynne Radio Company customers an additional, local, programming source, that could be picked up during daytime hours by less expensive receivers. WFBQ offices and broadcasting facilities were located in the Boone Building next to the Wake County Courthouse.

On August 15, 1925 the call letters were changed to WRCO, for Wynne Radio Company. Operations were moved to the Sir Walter Hotel, with the station's transmitting antenna strung between two towers constructed on the roof. The following year the power was increased to 250 watts. In June 1927 the station was assigned to 1380 kHz.

Durham Life Insurance

In the summer of 1927, WRCO was purchased by the Durham Life Insurance Company, which moved the station to 720 kHz, now with 500 watts, and changed the call letters to WPTF, reflecting the new owner's motto of "We Protect The Family". New equipment was purchased and the operations were moved to the basement of the old Durham Life building. Following a series of test transmissions, WPTF made its formal debut on November 14, 1927. On December 1, 1927 the station moved to 550 kHz, which was followed by a power increase to 1,000 watts. William Wynne initially stayed on as station engineer, but later left, continuing to work in the radio industry, and in 1933 set up WEED, the first radio station in Greenville.

On November 11, 1928, with the implementation of the Federal Radio Commission's General Order 40, WPTF was assigned to 680 kHz. KPO in San Francisco was designated as the primary occupant of this "clear channel" frequency, so WPTF was restricted to "limited time" operation, which prohibited WPTF from operating after San Francisco sunset, unless special permission had been received to operate with reduced power for additional hours.

In the early 1930s, WPTF was a pioneer in educational radio. Students in area schools that had radios were able to listen to a daily broadcast, with topics that included "Citizenship", "Science", "Social Studies" and "Art, Music and Literature".

Although many attempts were made over the next several years, it was not until 1933 that the station was authorized to increase its power to 5,000 watts. WPTF purchased new equipment and moved its transmitter site to near Cary, North Carolina, on US Highway 1. Two towers were built, that turned out to be defective, and in June of the next year winds from a thunderstorm collapsed one of the towers and damaged the other, requiring their replacement. These towers served as a prominent local landmark, and some nearby companies advertised their locations by noting their proximity.

Station upgrade

In June 1940, WPTF was authorized to operate unlimited hours, using a directional antenna to limit westward signals after sunset in San Francisco. A month later the station was granted a construction permit to install new transmitter equipment and increase its power to 50,000 watts, the maximum for AM stations in the U.S. A new transmission plant was constructed at the Cary transmitter site, which included replacing the two existing towers with 370-foot (113 meter) Blaw Know towers. The upgrade to 50,000 watts was delayed when a fire destroyed a new transmitter before it could go into regular service. On May 24, 1941, WPTF began operating with a replacement 50,000 watt transmitter. The next day, the station held an "open house" at the transmitter site, to show off "the new equipment, as modern and powerful as any in the country".

As of 1948, WPTF became an affiliate of the NBC Red Network. That year the station also received permission to install a third, taller, tower, designed to support the antenna for a new FM station.

Since the 1960s

Bart Ritner went to work at WPTF in 1966, staying for 39 years. He hosted the morning show "Ask Your Neighbor", with people giving advice or recipes. His most popular show was "Open Line", an hour-long call-in-show started in 1966 and expanded to two hours in 1973. Don Curtis, whose company later bought the station called the show "one of the nation's first daily two-way talk programs". Ritner moved to news in 1980. He was the only reporter at a 1982 hostage incident at Central Prison, helping to negotiate and end the standoff. Ritner returned to "Open Line" in 1986 and moved it from evenings to afternoons.

By the 1970s, WPTF offered a "full service format with news, talk, and adult contemporary music". Bob Kwesell, whose conservative views offended a number of listeners but attracted many newcomer and increased advertising, was dropped on November 17, 1986.

In 1991, Durham Life exited broadcasting in order to focus on its core insurance business. In 1996, the opening images of the music video for the Squirrel Nut Zippers song Hell included still photographs of the WPTF transmitter site in Cary, in order to establish the video's 1940s theme.

WPTF served as the flagship station for the NC State Wolfpack sports network for more than 40 years, until in 2008 the Wolfpack Sports Marketing announced it had signed a ten-year deal to move to Capitol Broadcasting Company's WRAL-FM. NC State athletic officials cited their desire to be on an FM signal with a multi-year contract and the ability to collect more local advertising revenue, conditions that Curtis Media was unwilling to provide. Some Wolfpack fans around the East Coast were unhappy with the move because it cut the audience of Wolfpack sports, especially at night, because of the reduced power.

As of September 15, 2008, WPTF began streaming its local and syndicated line up. After the September 2008 death of Jack Boston, Scott Fitzgerald took over North Carolina Morning News. Parent company Curtis Media announced in August 2009 the acquisition of The North Carolina News Network from Capitol Broadcasting Company of Raleigh. On November 2, 2009, Curtis Media President Phil Zachary said that Rush Limbaugh's program would be leaving WPTF on December 31, 2009, after more than 20 years. The show moved to Clear Channel Communications (now iHeartMedia's) FM talk radio station, 106.1 WRDU (now WTKK). The loss of long-time staples Limbaugh and Sean Hannity proved challenging for WPTF, and the station's ratings declined.

In December 2009, Brian Freeman, program director of sister station WSJS in Winston-Salem, North Carolina took over the same duties at WPTF and became the host of North Carolina's Morning News. WPTF aired NASCAR Sprint Cup Series and Nationwide Series racing, starting with the 2011 Daytona 500.

WPTF's format was split on March 13, 2012, when much of its talk programming moved to sister station WPTK, which was branded as TalkRadio 850 WPTF. WPTF shifted most of its daytime programming to all-news, retaining the NewsRadio 680 WPTF identity. The station continued to air The Dave Ramsey Show in the late morning hours until it was picked up by WTKK on June 15, 2013. In August 2015, WPTK dropped its talk show programs.

Until July 16, 2021 WPTF hosted a local talk show on weekday evenings with Tom Kearney. On July 28, 2021, the University of North Carolina at Chapel Hill's Tar Heel Sports Network switched its Raleigh/Durham affiliate from WTKK to WPTF beginning with the 2021 football season. The agreement also included broadcasts of men's basketball, along with the coaches' shows for both sports, and the weekly Primetime In The ACC show. This deal also made WPTF the new flagship station for the network.

Hurricane coverage
WPTF has historically provided hurricane coverage to residents of the Carolinas. WPTF first provided reports of Hurricane Hazel and has covered most major storms ever since.

Because of WPTF's directional nighttime signal, the station assisted the residents of Charleston, South Carolina after Hurricane Hugo hit the state in 1989. Most of coastal South Carolina, including the city of Charleston was without power, so local radio stations were knocked off the air. WPTF broadcast emergency information and even won several awards from the state of South Carolina for their assistance.

In 1996, WPTF provided coverage of Hurricane Fran even though the station was without utility power for nearly a week. The station and transmitter site ran on generator power, allowing residents in the Triangle and beyond to call in for storm and damage information and find out where to get needed supplies, such as ice, water, and food.

Sister stations

WPTF-FM

WPTF added an FM station on 94.5 MHz in 1949, with its antenna placed on the tallest of the AM station's three towers. At the beginning both stations operated from 410 South Salisbury street in Downtown Raleigh. The tower used by WPTF-FM when it signed on is currently used by WKIX-FM. WPTF-FM later moved to 94.7. The station played classical music before switching to album rock and the new call letters WQDR-FM in 1973, and later became a Country music station, still co-owned by Curtis Media.

WPTF-TV
In 1977, Durham Life bought the Triangle's longtime NBC affiliate, WRDU-TV (channel 28) and changed the call letters to WPTF-TV. All three stations were housed at studios in the Highwoods office park on Raleigh's north end. This station is now WRDC Channel 28.

Translators

References

External links

FCC History Cards for WPTF (covering 1924-1980 as WFBQ / WRCO / WPTF)

WPTF station history (wptf.com)
"Inside the WPTF Station: An Untouched Time Capsule from the 1940's", April 13, 2018 (abc11.com)
"WPTF: The First 50 Years" (1974 recording)

PTF
Radio stations established in 1924
News and talk radio stations in the United States
1924 establishments in North Carolina